Barłogi may refer to the following places:
Barłogi, Konin County in Greater Poland Voivodeship (west-central Poland)
Barłogi, Kuyavian-Pomeranian Voivodeship (north-central Poland)
Barłogi, Lublin Voivodeship (east Poland)
Barłogi, Koło County in Greater Poland Voivodeship (west-central Poland)
Barłogi, Lubusz Voivodeship (west Poland)